Zaraqoli may refer to:
 Zaraqoli-ye Bala
 Zaraqoli-ye Pain